The following article is a summary of the 2016–17 football season in Belgium, which is the 114th season of competitive football in the country and runs from July 2016 until June 2017.

National teams

Belgium national football team 

The Belgium national football team started their qualification campaign, winning 5 matches easily but needing a last minute equalizer at home against Greece to remain undefeated. They were less successful in friendlies, with two draws and one loss.

2018 FIFA World Cup qualification

Friendlies

Belgium women's national football team

Men's football

League season

Promotion and relegation
The following teams had achieved promotion or suffered relegation going into the 2016–17 season.

Belgian First Division A

Anderlecht secured its 34th championship, denying Club Brugge a second consecutive title. Oostende qualified for the first time for European football while Westerlo was relegated at the bottom end of the table.

Regular season

Championship play-offs

Belgian First Division B

In the opening tournament, Roeselare edged out Lierse to assure its place in the promotion play-offs. In the closing tournament, Lierse competed with Antwerp for the lead, with Lierse being overtaken by Antwerp on the final matchday. Therefore, Lierse, who scored the most points overall, did not qualify for the promotion play-offs which were instead played by Roeselare and Antwerp. Antwerp beat Roeselare twice (3–1 at home and 1–2 in Roeselare) and returned to the highest level of Belgian football after thirteen seasons at the second level. Roeselare did qualify for the Europa League play-offs together with Lierse and Union SG. At the bottom end, Lommel United was relegated.

Aggregate table

Promotion play-offs
Antwerp twice beat Roeselare and thereby allowed the club to return to the highest level of professional football in Belgium following thirteen seasons at the second level. Initially, they did not receive a license to compete in professional football the following season, but the decision was overturned. Roeselare got to play the Europa League play-offs.

Antwerp won 5–2 on aggregate and was promoted.

Relegation play-offs
The four bottom teams overall competed in the relegation play-offs. In spite of a strong comeback, Lommel United was relegated finally on the last matchday after losing away to OH Leuven.

Belgian First Amateur Division

Belgian Second Amateur Division

Division A

Division B

Division C

Belgian Third Amateur Division

Division A

Division B

Division C

Division D

Cup competitions

Transfers

UEFA competitions
Champions Club Brugge qualified directly for the group stage of the Champions League, while runners-up Anderlecht started in the qualifying rounds. As cup winner, Standard Liège qualified directly for the group stage of the Europa League, while Gent and Genk started in the qualifying rounds.

Overall, Belgian football clubs performed very strongly during the 2016–17 season, with both Anderlecht, Genk and Gent still active after the winter break and going very far in the 2016–17 UEFA Europa League, more specifically it was the first time since the 1993–94 season that three Belgian clubs reached the last 16 in Europe in the same season.

 Club Brugge had a difficult European season as they lost all six matches in the group stage of the 2016–17 UEFA Champions League, in a group with Leicester City, Porto and Copenhagen.
 Anderlecht also started mediocre, not getting past Rostov in the 2016–17 UEFA Champions League third qualifying round after first getting a 2–2 draw in Russia before losing 0–2 at home. As a result, they entered the Play-off round of the 2016–17 UEFA Europa League where they fared much better, by easily overcoming Slavia Prague (winning twice 3–0). In the group stage they started with a home win against Gabala and looked on their way to a 0–1 away win against Saint-Etienne before conceding and injury time equalizer. They then scored 4 points in two matches against Mainz, including a spectacular 6–1 home win. Injury time goals against Gabala secured qualification but on the final matchday Anderlecht gave away a 2–0 lead at home to Saint-Etienne to lose 2–3 and with that they also had to settle for the runner-up position. In the round of 32, Anderlecht were coupled with Zenit Saint Petersburg and were underdogs. Following a confident 2–0 home win they were going into the return leg with a comfortable lead, however Zenit stormed past Anderlecht in the return leg to lead 3–0 with only ten minutes to play. In the injury time, Isaac Kiese Thelin scored his first ever goal for Anderlecht to send them through on the away goals rule. In the round of 16, Anderlecht strolled past APOEL with two 1–0 victories before meeting Manchester United in the quarterfinals. At home, Leander Dendoncker headed in the 1–1 equalizer just minutes before the end of the match. At Old Trafford, Anderlecht held Manchester to another 1–1 draw, sending the match into extra time. Marcus Rashford finally scored the 2–1, eliminating Anderlecht in their first quarter final since 1997.
 In the same manner as Club Brugge but in the Europa League rather than the Champions League, Standard Liège had also qualified directly for the group stage and failed to progress. In contrary to Club Brugge however, Standard Liège did manage to score some points and were even in the running to progress up to last matchday. Standard started with a 1–1 draw at home with Celta de Vigo and a loss away to Ajax. They then scored 4 out of 6 against Panathinaikos before again holding Celta de Vigo to 1–1. On the last matchday, they needed to beat the result of Celta de Vigo playing away to Panathinaikos, but whereas Celta won, Standard Liège only managed to draw 1–1 with Ajax and where thus eliminated.
 Gent started in the third qualifying round of the Europa League where they started with a convincing 5–0 home win against Viitorul Constanța, followed up with a lacklustre 0–0 in Romania. In the play-off round Gent also had no problems with Macedonian team Shkëndija, winning twice: 2–1 at home and 4–0 away. They thus qualified for the group stage where they drew an uninteresting group with far away teams Konyaspor, Shakhtar Donetsk and Braga. Gent started with a 1–1 draw away to Braga before beating Konyaspor 2–0 at home. They then conceded ten goals over two matches with Shakhtar Donetsk, losing 5–0 in Ukraine and 3–5 in Ghent. After another draw with Braga (2–2), Gent went into the last match knowing that they could progress only in case of an away win at Konyaspor while also requiring Braga not to win against Shakhtar. Shakhtar soon took the lead but Gent struggled throughout the match to create chances against Konyaspor and looked on their way to elimination as the match was about to end in a goalless draw when in the fifth minute of extra time Kalifa Coulibaly scored from outside of the penalty area to send Gent through. Gent was rewarded with a draw in the round of 32 against Tottenham Hotspur and managed to stun Tottenham in a 1–0 home win with a goal from Jérémy Perbet. In the return leg at Wembley, Gent was expected by many to lose but eliminated Tottenham following a 2–2 draw, with Perbet again scoring for Gent. Gent was then eliminated by Genk in the round of 16 after first losing the home leg 2–5 after which they only managed a draw in Genk.
 Genk received the final ticket in Europe and had to start already in the second qualifying round of the Europa League where they were drawn against Budućnost Podgorica from Montenegro. A 2–0 home win in the opening leg was quickly undone in the return leg as Genk was down 0–2 at halftime and the score would remain after extra-time, forcing a penalty shoot-out which Genk won 4–2. Genk then had less trouble with Cork City from Ireland, winning twice to progress into the play-off round where they faced Croatian team Lokomotiva. Genk took a 0–2 lead in Croatia but conceded two goals to only score a 2–2 away draw but followed this up with a convincing 2–0 home win to move into the group stage where they were paired with Athletic Bilbao, Rapid Wien and Sassuolo. Genk lost 3–2 away to Rapid Wien in their opening match but recovered with two home wins against Sassuolo (3–1) and Athletic Bilbao (2–0). They were then defeated 5–3 in Bilbao before scoring their third home win, beating Rapid Wien 1–0. Genk were already certain of qualification for the round of 16 before their final match, which was postponed by one day due to heavy fog in Sassuolo. As a result, on a Friday afternoon in an empty stadium, Genk won 0–2 away to Sassuolo in a match which had no more importance for neither team. In the round of 32, Genk drew 2–2 away to Romanian team Astra Giurgiu and then won the return match 1–0 before meeting Gent in the round of 16. Genk overclassed Gent during the first leg in Ghent, winning 2–5 and virtually killing the tie. The return ended in a dull 1–1 draw. Genk then fell to Celta de Vigo in the quarter-finals after first losing 3–2 in Spain but then coming one goal short as they were held to a 1–1 draw in Genk.

European qualification for 2017–18 summary

Managerial changes
This is a list of changes of managers within Belgian professional league football (Belgian First Division A and Belgian First Division B):

See also
 2016–17 Belgian First Division A
 2016–17 Belgian First Division B
 2016–17 Belgian First Amateur Division
 2016–17 Belgian Second Amateur Division
 2016–17 Belgian Third Amateur Division
 2016–17 Belgian Cup
 2016 Belgian Super Cup

Notes

References

 
2016 in association football
2017 in association football